East Holmes Local Schools is a school district in Holmes County, Ohio.

It was established in 1958.

Schools
Secondary schools:
Hiland High School
Hiland Middle School

Elementary schools:
 Berlin Elementary School
 Charm Elementary School
 Chestnut Ridge Elementary School
Flatridge Elementary School
Mt. Hope Elementary School
Walnut Creek Elementary School
Winesburg Elementary School
Wise Elementary School

References

External links
 East Holmes Local Schools
 
School districts in Ohio
Education in Holmes County, Ohio
1958 establishments in Ohio
School districts established in 1958